Monorhyme is a passage, stanza, or entire poem in which all lines have the same end rhyme. The term "monorhyme" describes the use of one ( mono) type of repetitious sound (rhyme). This is common in Arabic, Latin and Welsh work, such as The Book of One Thousand and One Nights, e.g. qasida and its derivative kafi.

Some styles of monorhyme use the end of a poem's line to utilize this poetic tool. The Persian ghazal poetry style places the monorhyme before the refrain in a line. This is seen in the poem "Even the Rain" by Agha Shahid Aili:

"What will suffice for a true-love knot? Even the rain?
 But he has bought grief's lottery, bought even the rain."

The monorhyme knot is introduced before the line’s refrain or pause. The corresponding rhyme bought is used in the next line. Although these are not the last words of the lines in the poem, monorhyme is incorporated in identical rhyme schemes in each line.

Example 
An example of monorhyme is the poem "A Monorhyme for the Shower" by Dick Davis. This monorhyme has all the ending lines rhyming with the word "hair".

A Monorhyme for the Shower
Lifting her arms to soap her hair
Her pretty breasts respond – and there
The movement of that buoyant pair
Is like a spell to make me swear
Twenty odd years have turned to air;
Now she’s the girl I didn’t dare
Approach, ask out, much less declare
My love to, mired in young despair.
Childbearing, rows, domestic care
All the prosaic wear and tear
That constitute the life we share
Slip from her beautiful and bare
Bright body as, made half aware
Of my quick, surreptitious stare,
She wrings the water from her hair
 And turning smiles to see me there.

There is also a monorhyme sung and cited by Willy Wonka in the 1973 film Willy Wonka and the Chocolate Factory during the dark tunnel scene with all words rhyming with "owing".

See also 
 Perfect and imperfect rhymes
 "Every Breath You Take"

Sources 

 

Rhyme
Stanzaic form